Coleophora magnatella is a moth of the family Coleophoridae. It is found in Afghanistan and Iran.

The larvae feed on Glycyrrhiza glabra and Meristotropis triphylla. They feed on the shoots of their host plant.

References

magnatella
Moths described in 1959
Moths of Asia